The  a fortified palace in Manipur, India; may also refer to:
 Kangla Sanathong, Western entrance gate to the Kangla Fort
 Kangla Nongpok Thong, Eastern Gate of the Kangla Fort
 Kangla Nongpok Torban, a recreation area in the eastern boundaries of the Kangla
 Kanglā Shā (Kangla Sha), Guardian dragon lion in Meitei mythology 
 Kangla Polo Ground
 Kangla Pakhangba Temple
 Kangla Museum
 Kangla Archaeological Museum
 Kangla Memento Museum
 Kangla Boatyard

Kangla